The 2003–04 Belgian Hockey League season was the 84th season of the Belgian Hockey League, the top level of ice hockey in Belgium. Four teams participated in the league, and Olympia Heist op den Berg won the championship.

Playoffs

Semifinals 
 Phantoms Deurne - White Caps Turnhout 1:2 (8:2, 4:5 OT, 4:5 OT)
 Olympia Heist op den Berg - Chiefs Leuven 3:1 (8:1, 4:6, 8:1, 5:4)

Final 
 White Caps Turnhout - Olympia Heist op den Berg 0:2 (4:5, 0:6)

References
Season on hockeyarchives.info

Belgian Hockey League
Belgian Hockey League seasons
Bel